The following is a list of the highest goalscorers in Primera División de Fútbol Profesional from 1998 to present.

List of goalscorers

By club

By country

By player

External links
http://archivo.elgrafico.com/especiales/hg/historico.html

Primera División de Fútbol Profesional players
Association football player non-biographical articles